Adamo is an Italian personal name.

Adamo may also refer to:
 Adamo, Mozambique, village in Ancuabe District in Cabo Delgado Province in northeastern Mozambique
 Adamo Demolition or the Adamo Group, a Detroit-based asbestos remediation and demolition company
 Dell Adamo, line of Dell laptops

See also
 Adamos (disambiguation)